Duncan James is an Australian singer born in Brisbane, Australia, who was signed to BMG and is best known for his single "The Speed of Life" from the same titled album.

Discography

Albums

Singles

References

Australian male singers
Living people
Year of birth missing (living people)